is a railway station located in Kagoshima, Kagoshima, Japan. The station opened in 1934.

Lines 
Kyushu Railway Company
Ibusuki Makurazaki Line

JR

Adjacent stations

Nearby places
Nippon Oil storage facilities
Kagoshima City Nakamyō Elementary School
Nakamyō Post office

Railway stations in Kagoshima Prefecture
Railway stations in Japan opened in 1934